Wild Mouse is a steel roller coaster located in Hersheypark designed by Mack Rides in 1999. It is located in the Midway America section of Hersheypark. Riders are placed in single carts on a thin track. The ride frequently makes sharp turns, giving riders the illusion they are about to fall off the track. When this occurs the riders are jerked as they turn.

In October, when Hersheypark is decorated in a Halloween theme (Hersheypark in the Dark), the Wild Mouse is dubbed Mouse Stew.

Hersheypark usually runs their Wild Mouse with very little braking on the upper level, loading slow-moving cars in the station, and allows four adults per car. By comparison, Dorney Park & Wildwater Kingdom's Wild Mouse is run with more brake pressure, cars stop to load in the station, and the park allows a two-adult restriction. Despite these differences, and the different manufacturers, the ride layout of these two Wild Mouse coasters are nearly identical (designed by Werner Stengel). The Wild Mouse features an on-ride camera during one of the drops.

Hersheypark
Roller coasters introduced in 1999
Wild Mouse roller coasters